Hässelby-Vällingby is a borough (stadsdelsområde) in the western part of Stockholm, Sweden.
It is primarily made up of Hässelby (Gård, Strand, Villastad) and Vällingby. The other districts that make up the borough are Backlura, Kälvesta, Nälsta, Råcksta and Vinsta. , the population is 58,796 in an area of 19.60 km², which gives a density of 2,999.80/km².

The name is taken from Hässelby Castle (Hesselby Slott)  which included large areas within the present three districts. The port of Hässelby also includes parts of Vinsta. The castle is located in the present district of Hässelby Gård but in the postcode of Vällingby.

References

External links

Boroughs of Stockholm
Västerort